Snakes & Ladders is the tenth studio album by British rapper Wiley. The album's features include JME, Flirta D, Stormzy, Solo 45, J Writer, Problem, Gudda Gudda, Cam'ron, Footsie, Wrigz, J2K, Double S, Maxsta, Chip, and Hollow Da Don. Wiley announced via Twitter that it would be his last solo album, however his next album, Godfather (2017), originally became his last studio album until Wiley announced on 3 November 2017 that he had a change of heart and released a new album, titled Godfather II, on 27 April 2018.

Track listing

Accolades

References

2014 albums
Wiley (musician) albums